The Battle of Electricity is the second and final album by Athens-based Elephant 6 band The Gerbils.

Track listing
All tracks by John D'Azzo/Scott Spillane except where noted.

"Are You Underwater" (John D'Azzo/J. Kirk Pleasant) – 4:29
"(i)" – :48
"The Air we Share" – 3:57
"Lucky Girl" – 5:21
"(ii)" – 1:14
"Fail to Mention" – 3:31
"(iii)" – :27
"Meteoroid From the Sun Strikes a Dead Weirdo" – 2:30
"(iv)" – :47
"A Song of Love" – 2:52
"(v)" – 1:49
"The White Sky" – 2:57
"(vi)" – :24
"(vii)" – 1:48
"Snorkel" – 3:10
"The Battle of Electricity" – 3:13
"Share Again" – 3:46
"(viii)" – 1:32

Personnel
Scott Spillane - Vocals, Guitar, Horns
Will Westbrook - Guitar, Bass, Vocals
John D'Azzo - Drums, Vocals
Jeremy Barnes - Drums
Kevin Barnes - Vocals
Bill Doss - Guitar, Vocals
Peter Erchick - Electric Piano, Accordion
Eric Harris - Drums
Christian Hogan - Piano, Oboe, Bassoon
Heather McIntosh - Cello
Beth Sale - Vocals

References

The Gerbils albums
2001 albums